The Shropshire Senior Cup is a county cup football competition that is open for professional and non-professional senior football teams in the English county of Shropshire.

The competition is one of the oldest cup competitions in the world, and notably, the original winning trophy is still presented to the winners, some 130 years after the Cup's inception. It is organised by the Shropshire Football Association and is annual.

The competition was first staged in the 1877–78 season, the inaugural winners being Shrewsbury F.C, who beat Wellington Parish Church Institute 1–0. (Shrewsbury F.C are not connected to the current Shrewsbury Town, and dissolved late in 1879.)

Over the years, the competition has been dominated by the county's two leading football teams, Shrewsbury Town and Telford United, and more recently A.F.C. Telford United following the demise of the old Telford United in 2004.

Other county teams to have featured in the cup in recent years have included Market Drayton Town, Shifnal Town, Bridgnorth Town, Ludlow Town and The New Saints.

Past winners